Hymenocallis henryae is a rare plant known only from 4 counties in northwestern Florida (Liberty, Gulf, Bay, and Walton). Common names include "green spider-lily" and "Henry’s spider-lily."

The plant is a bulb-forming herb found along cypress depressions at the edge of pine woodlands. It is distinguished from other members of the genus by its pale green tepals and its white funnel-form corona.

References

henryae
Endemic flora of Florida
Plants described in 1962
Flora without expected TNC conservation status